Le Moulinet-sur-Solin (literally Le Moulinet on Solin) is a commune in the Loiret department in north-central France.

Geography
The river Solin has its source in the commune.

See also
Communes of the Loiret department

References

Moulinetsursolin